Ptychadena tournieri is a species of frog in the family Ptychadenidae. It is a widespread species in West Africa and found in Senegal, Gambia, Guinea-Bissau, Guinea, Sierra Leone, Liberia, and Ivory Coast, as well as in Togo and Benin; it is assumed to occur in Ghana and southeastern Burkina Faso, although it has not been recorded there. On the other hand, some records may refer to other species; the Amphibian Species of the World excludes Gambia and Togo from the distribution. Common names Liberia grassland frog and Tournier's rocket frog are sometimes used.

Etymology
The specific name tournieri refers to Jean-Luc Tournier, who was director of the Institut Français d’Afrique Noire in Abidjan (now Institut Fondamental d'Afrique Noire).

Description
Adult males measure  and females  in snout–vent length. The webbing in feet leaves one phalanx of toe V free (two in P. pujoli). The head is slightly longer than wide and with a pointed snout. The tympanum is almost as large as the eye. The dorsum has two pairs of dorsal ridges, with granulated skin in between, and a pair of dorsolateral ridges. Fine ridges are present also on the thighs and shanks. The upper lip is white. There are dark canthal lines that run from beyond the tympanum to the flanks, becoming somewhat thinner posteriorly. The dorsal ridges are white to light red whereas the dorsolateral ridges are white.

Habitat and conservation
Ptychadena tournieri inhabits humid savanna areas, and can also survive altered habitats such as rice paddies. Reproduction takes place in small, stagnant and shallow temporary waters as well as in flooded fields and pans. This adaptable species is not considered to face significant threats.

References

tournieri
Amphibians of West Africa
Taxa named by Jean Marius René Guibé
Taxonomy articles created by Polbot
Amphibians described in 1955